The following list contains the videography for Sidhu Moose Wala, including his own music videos and videos that feature him. He has released three video albums and has been featured in over thirty music videos.

Music videos

As lead artist

As featured artist

Cameo appearances

Music albums

Film

Actor

Music albums for films

References

Videographies of Canadian artists
Indian entertainment-related lists